"Hold Me Tight" is a 1963 song by the Beatles.

Hold Me Tight may also refer to:

Film and television
Hold Me Tight (1933 film), an American film
Hold Me Tight (2010 film), a Danish film
Hold Me Tight (2021 film), a French film 
Hold Me Tight (TV series), a 2018 South Korean TV series

Music

Albums
Hold Me Tight, by Shirley Bassey, 2013
Hold Me Tight, by Yasuhiro Abe, 1983

Songs
"Hold Me Tight" (Cold Chisel song), 1983
"Hold Me Tight" (Johnny Nash song), 1968
"Hold Me Tight", by Asian Kung-Fu Generation from I'm Standing Here
"Hold Me Tight", by Billy "Crash" Craddock from Changes
"Hold Me Tight", by BTS from The Most Beautiful Moment in Life, Pt. 1
"Hold Me Tight", by Loco
"Hold Me Tight", by Missy Higgins, a B-side of the single "The Sound of White"
"Hold Me Tight", by Paul McCartney and Wings from Red Rose Speedway
"Hold Me Tight", by Scorpions from Animal Magnetism
"Hold Me Tight", by Twice from Signal

See also
"Hold Me Tight or Don't", a song by Fall Out Boy
Hold Tight (disambiguation)
Hold On Tight (disambiguation)
Hold You Tight (disambiguation)